The Hong Kong Academy for Gifted Education (HKAGE)  is a non-governmental organisation dedicated to offering information, support and learning opportunities to gifted students aged 10–18 years. It was established in 2007. Most programs and services are provided free of charge.

History 
Gifted education in Hong Kong started in 1990 when the development of school-based gifted education was initiated by the Education Commission Report No.4.
In the Policy Address 2006-07, Chief Executive Donald Tsang announced the establishment of the HKAGE to provide more structured, articulated and challenging off-site programs for gifted students, and to promote the concepts and practices of gifted education.

The Legislative Council Panel on Education discussed in November 2006 the Administration’s proposal to provide financial support for the establishment of the HKAGE.

HKAGE was founded in 2007. A total of $200 million was donated by the Government and Sir Joseph Hotung to HKAGE as the start-up funding. HKAGE started the planning and preparatory work in early 2008 and delivery of programs and services at Kowloon Tong Education Services Centre in September 2008.

In January 2012, HKAGE moved to Sha Kok Estate in Sha Tin, alongside the Shing Mun River to provide a larger capacity and more facilities. Since September 2017, the HKAGE became a subvented Non-Governmental Organisation (NGO) and its funding comes mainly from the government.

References

Gifted education
Educational organisations based in Hong Kong